Al Thompson was an actor.

Al Thompson may also refer to:

Al Thompson and Son's
Al Thompson, bassist in Bill Haley and the Comets

See also
Albert Thompson (disambiguation)
Allen Thompson (disambiguation)
Alan Thompson (disambiguation)
Alvin Thompson, judge